Simon Dinnerstein (born February 16, 1943) is an American artist, best known for the painted work, The Fulbright Triptych (1971).

Early life
Dinnerstein was born in Brownsville, Brooklyn, New York, in 1943 to pharmacist Louis and homemaker Sarah Dinnerstein. One of two children, his older brother Harvey Dinnerstein was also an artist.

Education and career
Dinnerstein holds a Bachelor of Arts in History from the City College of New York. He studied painting and drawing at the Brooklyn Museum Art School with Louis Grebenak, David Levine, and Richard Mayhew. He was a member of the faculty at the New School for Social Research, Parsons School of Design, and New York City Technical College. He lectures widely and has lectured at Pennsylvania State University.

Style and influences
Dinnerstein's art is mostly in the figurative style, with folk, expressionistic, and surrealistic influences, possessing a "narrative" and "psychological edge". He uses a variety of media, pencils, charcoal, and oil paints. Dinnerstein renders still-lifes, but most of his work involves portraiture or human figures. He often "paints the figure in unexpected juxtaposition with landscape or interior elements", of which Dinnerstein says,

What interests me is the ability of Degas, Balthus, Lucian Freud and Antonio López García ... to deal with the figure ... to create art ... rich in scale, yet abstract adventurous, experimental ... deeply human ... a combination of modernism and tradition of skill medium and ... a fresh, personal response to the human form in art ... Hopefully my work speaks to these issues.

Often the human figures are portrayed against a background of hyperreality, or in dreamy surreal landscapes. Light plays an important role in Dinnerstein's work achieving "an inwardness ... in the play of light that radiates from the object and renders it mysterious" or makes "Brooklyn sunlight on an ordinary floor seem supernatural." The use of light contributes to Dinnerstein's paintings being described as "magical realism". In early Dinnerstein works, strong left-right symmetry prevails, although later works are noted for their asymmetry. Dinnerstein draws on diverse sources for inspiration: Northern European art (Albrecht Dürer, Hieronymus Bosch), Mexican art (Frida Kahlo, Diego Rivera), as well as literature (D. H. Lawrence, August Strindberg)
and film (Ingmar Bergman, Alfred Hitchcock).

The Fulbright Triptych
Dinnerstein's most notable painting, The Fulbright Triptych, was started in Germany in 1971 while he served as a Fulbright Scholar in Graphics. It was completed in 1974. A largely autobiographical work, it combines stark realism with American figurative tradition to produce a secular rendering of the usually religious form, the triptych.

Writer Jonathan Lethem commented: "Simon Dinnerstein's The Fulbright Triptych is one of those singular and astonishing works of art which seem to imply a description of the whole world merely by insisting on a scrupulous gaze at one perfect instant." The oil-on-wood painting consists of three panels approximately 14 feet wide, depicting a graphic artist's studio. Three figures, representing the Dinnerstein family, occupy the outer panels. The central panel consists of the artist's desk, engraving tools, a copper disk of the commissioned Fulbright engraving project, and an outward view in perspective of Hessisch Lichtenau (near to Kassel). Plants, photographs, old master's paintings, children's grade school writing, and an exit visa from Russia, appear tacked to the wall of the studio. The Triptych is noted for its symmetry, meticulous detail, mixture of textures, and sense of space.

Widely praised, with each viewer bringing a different sensibility and interpretation of the work, the painting is the subject of numerous essays, articles, and books, including The Suspension of Time: Reflections of Simon Dinnerstein's 'The Fulbright Triptych edited by Daniel Slager, published 2011. Among the many who have commented on the painting are art critic John Russell, Guggenheim Foundation director Thomas M. Messer, art historian Albert Boime, artist George Tooker, writer Anthony Doerr, composer George Crumb, poet Dan Beachy-Quick, actor John Turturro, and Pulitzer Prize winner Jhumpa Lahiri.

Personal life
In 1965, Dinnerstein married Renée Sudler, a noted educational consultant. Renée Dinnerstein is the author of the book Choice Time: How to Deepen Learning Through Inquiry and Play, PreK-2 published in August 2016. She runs the popular blog, Investigating Choice Time: Inquiry, Exploration and Play. They have a daughter, Simone Dinnerstein, a concert pianist. Both wife and daughter (as an infant) figure prominently in The Fulbright Triptych as well as other works.

Dinnerstein resides in Brooklyn, where, in addition to practicing his art, he teaches classes on art history and appreciation.

Videos and podcasts
Simone Dinnerstein and Simon Dinnerstein In Conversation: An Interview with Robin Quivers at Consulate General of Germany, 2011
Triptych: An Evening of Painting and Music (Simon Dinnerstein, The Fulbright Triptych and Robert Sirota, "Triptych", performed by the Chiara String Quartet)
Simon Dinnerstein Exhibit at the Tenri Gallery: A Walk Through with Francis Cunningham, 2011
Simon Dinnerstein and The Fulbright Triptych, audiocast interview with James McElhinney, Huffington Post, April 1, 2013
“Simone Dinnerstein and Simon Dinnerstein: A Conversation on the Mysteries of Art and Family, 2018

List of awards

Exhibitions

Articles and reviews
Michael Andre, Simon Dinnerstein (Staempfli), Art News, March, 1975                         
John Gruen, "On Art: Freilicher, Fish, Dinnerstein, Peterson, Baber", SoHo Weekly News, February 6, 1975
George Staempfli, catalog essay, one-man exhibit, Staempfli Gallery, January 14 – February 8, 1975
Bennett Schiff, On a Roman Hill Scholars Dwell in an Estate Of Mind, Smithsonian, March, 1978
Doug Turetsky, Simon Dinnerstein:  Artist in the Round, Brooklyn Affairs, April, 1985         
Simon Dinnerstein, Looking At One's Own Artwork, American Artist, April, 1986                   
Theodore Wolff, The Kind Word for Such Art is 'Conservative'. The Christian Science Monitor, April 25, 1988
Albert Boime, Introduction: Simon Dinnerstein's Family Romance, The Art of Simon Dinnerstein, The University of Arkansas Press, 1990
Thomas M. Messer, Foreword, The Art of Simon Dinnerstein, The University of Arkansas Press, 1990,  
Richard Mertens, Essential Realities: Simon Dinnerstein Draws the Essence of Art from the Commonplace, The Concord Monitor, October 25, 1991     
Rudolph Arnheim, Pictures of the Lasting World, Simon Dinnerstein: Paintings and Drawings, Hudson Hills Press, (October 12, 1999)  
Deborah McLeod, From Visceral Portraits to Romanticized Nymphs, Bodies of Work, Richmond Times, September 1, 2000       
Edward Sullivan, The Urban View in the Art of Simon Dinnerstein, Simon Dinnerstein: Paintings and Drawings, Hudson Hills Press, 2000
Roy Proctor, Exploring the Edge: No Slave to fashion, artist draws us into other states of mind, Richmond Times-Dispatch, August 20, 2000         
Joe Maniscalco, An Artist at Work: Park Slope Painter Lets You in on the Creative Process, Park Slope Courier, January 31, 2000  
Ilana Abramovitch, From Brownsville to Park Slope: An Interview with Simon Dinnerstein, Jews of Brooklyn, Brandeis University Press; 1st edition (November 1, 2001)   
Gabriela Lena Frank, Ghosts in the Dream Machine for Piano Quintet, (Composer's Statement), March 14, 2005  Composer's Statement    
Cynthia Maris Dantzic   100 New York Painters  Publisher: Schiffer Publishing Ltd., (November 2006)  ,   page 85
Elana Hagler,  Pursuing Humanity: An Interview with Simon Dinnerstein, April 21, 2013 Pursuing Humanity:An Interview with Simon Dinnerstein
Featuring: Simon Dinnerstein, Colored Pencil magazine, December 2014

Books
The Art of Simon Dinnerstein, The University of Arkansas Press, Fayetteville, London, 1990. Essays by Albert Boime, Thomas M. Messer, George Tooker.
Simon Dinnerstein: Paintings and Drawings, Hudson Hills Press, New York, 1999. Essays by Rudolf Arnheim, Guy Davenport, Robert L. McGrath, John Russell, Edward J. Sullivan, Miller Willams.
The Suspension of Time: Reflections on Simon Dinnerstein and 'The Fulbright Triptych, Daniel Slager (Editor), Publisher:  Milkweed Editions; First Edition  (June 14, 2011). Forty-five essays on The Fulbright Triptych.

References

External links

The Fulbright Triptych articles and reviews

Roberta Smith, senior art critic, The New York Times, Re-discovered at the Altar of Art", August 11, 2011
 Roberta Smith, The New York Times, Simon Dinnerstein: The Fulbright Triptych, Museum & Gallery Listings, (listed for 81 consecutive weeks)
Roberta Smith, The New York Times, "Last Chance: Simon Dinnerstein: The Fulbright Triptych", April 25, 2014
John Russell, senior art critic, The New York Times, "In Dinnerstein's Painting, an Echo Chamber", February 5, 1975
Thomas M. Messer, "No One Could Accuse" from The Suspension of Time by Dennis Slager, editor
Donald Kuspit, contributing editor, Simon Dinnerstein: German Consulate General, Art Forum, November 2011
James Panero, senior art critic, The New Criterion, Exhibition note, September, 2011
Peter Trippi, editor-in-chief, Savoring Simon Dinnerstein's Fulbright Triptych, Fine Art Connoisseur, January/February 2014
David Cohen, "The Art of Simon Dinnerstein", Art Critical, October 7, 2011
Daniel Maidman, Simon Dinnerstein's Irregular Grid, Huffington Post, February 13, 2014
Tim Nicholas, "Simon Dinnerstein: Analog of a World", Painter's Table, March 2014
Kaitlin Pomerantz, "Luck of the Paint", BOMBlog (Bomb Magazine – Artists in Conversation), August 30, 2012
Eric Herschthal, "The Jewish Echoes in The Fulbright Triptych", The Jewish Week, August 9, 2011
Rebecca Park, "The Fulbright Triptych: Portrait of the Young Man as an Artist", Diplomatic Courier
Brian P. Kelly, "Critic's Notebook", The New Criterion, March 24, 2014
Guy Davenport, "An Exchange of Letters", The Suspension of Time by Daniel Slager, editor
Jhumpa Lahiri, "The Space Between the Pictures", The Suspension of Time by Daniel Slager, editor
Edward Sullivan, "The Theology of Art", The Suspension of Time by Daniel Slager, editor
George Tooker, Jonathan Lethem, J.M. Coetzee, The Suspension of Time
Elizabeth Broun, Virginia Mecklenburg, Grady Harp, (untitled, undated, unattributed), [claimed: Vanity Fair, July 2011]
Jonathan Liu, "Simon Dinnerstein Says", New York Observer, May 31, 2011
Press release, The Suspension of Time, Milkweed Editions, 2011
Press release, The Suspension of Time, Milkweed Editions, Victoria Meyer

20th-century American painters
American male painters
21st-century American painters
21st-century male artists
American contemporary painters
American printmakers
American art educators
Painters from New York City
City College of New York alumni
Hyperreality
Jewish American artists
Jewish painters
Magic realist artists
Modern painters
People from Brownsville, Brooklyn
1943 births
Living people
Brooklyn Museum Art School alumni